Lützen-Wiesengrund was a Verwaltungsgemeinschaft ("collective municipality") in the district Burgenlandkreis, in Saxony-Anhalt, Germany. It was situated east of Weißenfels. The seat of the Verwaltungsgemeinschaft was in Lützen. It was disbanded in January 2011.

Subdivision
The Verwaltungsgemeinschaft Lützen-Wiesengrund consisted of the following municipalities:

 Dehlitz 
 Lützen
 Sössen 
 Zorbau

References

Former Verwaltungsgemeinschaften in Saxony-Anhalt
Lützen